Dimitrios "Mitsos" Partsalidis (1905–1980) was a Greek communist politician.

Biography 

Partsalidis was a Pontic Greek born in Trabzon in the Trebizond Vilayet of the Ottoman Empire. During the population exchange between Greece and Turkey, Partsalidis was expelled to Greece, as were all members of the Greek Orthodox Church.

Partsaldis soon joined the Communist Party of Greece and became involved in politics. In 1934, with the backing of the tobacco cultivators, he was elected mayor of Kavala, being the first member of the Communist Party to be elected mayor of any Greek city. There followed a wave of electoral wins in Communist strongholds and those elected were nicknamed the Red Mayors.

During the Greek Civil War, on April 3, 1949, Partsalidis became head of the Provisional Democratic Government formed by the Communists in areas under their effective control, succeeding Nikolaos Zachariadis. He was the final head of the Provisional Government, and remained in office until October 1950 (in exile after August 28, 1949). At the Battle of Grammos-Vitsi the communist Democratic Army of Greece (DSE) was defeated and he was forced into exile to Soviet Union.

In October 1971, Partsalidis was arrested by the Greek military junta of 1967–1974 along with Charalambos Drakopoulos (el), the General Secretary of the KKE Interior party. Partsalidis died in Athens on June 22, 1980. He published his memoirs in 1978.

Attribution
This article contains text from the article Dimitrios Partsalidis at Phantis, a GFDL wiki.

References

1905 births
1980 deaths
20th-century Greek politicians
20th-century people from the Ottoman Empire
People from Trabzon
People from Trebizond vilayet
Pontic Greeks
Communist Party of Greece politicians
All People Front politicians
Greek MPs 1936
Greek memoirists
National Liberation Front (Greece) members
History of Kavala
Exiles of the Greek Civil War in the Soviet Union
20th-century memoirists
Prisoners and detainees of Greece
Emigrants from the Ottoman Empire to Greece